The second season of Braxton Family Values, an American reality television series, was broadcast on WE tv. The series aired from November 10, 2011 until September 20, 2012, consisting of 26 episodes.

Production
Braxton Family Values was officially renewed for its second season on March 10, 2011, announced by WE tv.

U.S. television ratings
The season's premiere episode "R.E.S.P.E.C.T" attracted over 1.18 million viewers during its initial broadcast on November 10, 2011, including 0.600 thousand viewers in the 18–49 demographic via Nielsen ratings. The season's most watched episode "Desert Divas", attracted over 1.39 million viewers during its initial broadcast on January 26, 2012, including 0.800 thousand viewers in the 18–49 demographic via Nielsen ratings.

Episodes

References

External links

 
 
 

2011 American television seasons
2012 American television seasons